Cytochrome P450 1B1 is an enzyme that in humans is encoded by the CYP1B1 gene.

Function 

CYP1B1 belongs to the cytochrome P450 superfamily of enzymes.  The cytochrome P450 proteins are monooxygenases which catalyze many reactions involved in drug metabolism and synthesis of cholesterol, steroids, and other lipids. The enzyme encoded by this gene localizes to the endoplasmic reticulum (ER) and metabolizes procarcinogens such as polycyclic aromatic hydrocarbons and 17beta-estradiol.

Despite over 20 years of research on CYP1A1 and CYP1A2, CYP1B1 was not identified and sequenced until 1994.  Nucleic and amino acid analysis showed approximately 40% identity with CYP1A1.  Despite this similarity, these two enzymes have very different catalytic efficiencies and metabolites when incubated with common substrates, such as retinoic acid and arachidonic acid.  Recently CYP1B1 has been shown to be physiologically important in fetal development, since mutations in CYP1B1 are linked with a form of primary congenital glaucoma.

CYP1A1 and CYP1B1 are regulated by the aryl hydrocarbon receptor, a ligand activated transcription factor.  They are part of the Phase I reactions of drug metabolism.

Clinical significance 

Mutations in this gene have been associated with primary congenital glaucoma; therefore it is thought that the enzyme also metabolizes a signaling molecule involved in eye development, possibly a steroid.

References

Further reading

External links
 
 
  GeneReview/NCBI/NIH/UW entry on Primary Congenital Glaucoma
 

1